Luis Ernesto Tapia Pérez (born October 21, 1944 in Panama) is a retired football forward, who is regarded as the best player ever in Panama.

He was active on the Panama national football team between 1963 and 1979.

Club career
A native of Barrio El Granillo, in Panama City (Between Chorrillo and Barraza (lanes 17 and 21 West)), debuted very young with Panama national football team, during a tour on El Salvador, was signed by the Alianza of that country.

Known as the "Central-american Pele", Luis Ernesto "Cascarita" Tapia lived its golden age in El Salvador during the 1960s and 1970s, especially with the Alianza and still remembered by his fans, facing dozens of famous Brazilian players.

On March 19, 1971, in the then Estadio Revolución, about 25,000 fans witnessed the match between Brazil's Santos and Primera División side Atlético Marte. In the Brazilian team was the King Pele, while on the side Atlético Marte "Cascarita" Tapia.

International career
Was part of the team that participated for the first time in a World Cup qualifier, for Argentina 1978 World Cup and had the honor of scoring the first goal for Panama in these competitions, he also toured with the Panama on Asia, facing famous Hector Chumpitaz´s Peru team. He scored 20 goals in 77 games for Panama.

Legacy
In his honor, the Training Court next to Estadio Rommel Fernandez also known as mini-Rommel bears his name.

International goals
Scores and results list Panama's goal tally first.

Honours and awards

Club
Alianza F.C.
CONCACAF Champions League (1): 1967
Primera División (2): 1965-66, 1966–67

Aletico Marte
Primera División (1): 1970

Juventud Olímpica
Primera División (1): 1973

References

External links

1944 births
Living people
Sportspeople from Panama City
Association football forwards
Panamanian footballers
Panama international footballers
Alianza F.C. footballers
C.D. Atlético Marte footballers
Panamanian expatriate footballers
Expatriate footballers in El Salvador
C.S.D. Galcasa players